Bellas Artes, a Spanish-language term, can refer to:

Bellas Artes metro station (Caracas), Venezuela
Bellas Artes metro station (Mexico City), Mexico
Bellas Artes metro station (Santiago), Chile
Palacio de Bellas Artes, a cultural center in Mexico City
Bellas Artes (Mexico City Metrobús), a BRT station in Mexico City
Fine art, a style of painting popular at the turn of the 19th and 20th century

See also 
Beaux arts (disambiguation)
Museo de Bellas Artes (disambiguation)